Matthew M. Joyce (April 29, 1877 – January 12, 1956) was a United States district judge of the United States District Court for the District of Minnesota.

Education and career

Born on April 29, 1877, in Emmetsburg, Iowa, Joyce attended the University of Michigan Law School and read law in 1900. He entered private practice in Missoula, Montana from 1900 to 1910. He continued private practice in Fort Dodge, Iowa from 1910 to 1917. He was an attorney for the Minneapolis and St. Louis Railway in Minneapolis, Minnesota from 1917 to 1932.

Federal judicial service

Joyce was nominated by President Herbert Hoover on January 28, 1932, to a seat on the United States District Court for the District of Minnesota vacated by Judge John B. Sanborn Jr. He was confirmed by the United States Senate on February 3, 1932, and received his commission on February 11, 1932. He assumed senior status on October 11, 1954. His service terminated on January 12, 1956, due to his death in Hennepin County, Minnesota.

See also
 United States District Court for the District of Minnesota

References

External links
 

1877 births
1956 deaths
Judges of the United States District Court for the District of Minnesota
United States district court judges appointed by Herbert Hoover
20th-century American judges
People from Fort Dodge, Iowa
University of Michigan Law School alumni
People from Emmetsburg, Iowa
People from Missoula, Montana
United States federal judges admitted to the practice of law by reading law